The Barany chair or Bárány chair is a device used for aerospace physiology training, particularly for student pilots.

Test
The subject is placed in the chair, blindfolded, then spun about the vertical axis while keeping their head upright or tilted forward or to the side. The subject is then asked to perform tasks such as determine their direction of rotation while blindfolded, or rapidly change the orientation of their head, or attempt to point at a stationary object without blindfold after the chair is stopped. The chair is used to demonstrate spatial disorientation effects, proving that the vestibular system is not to be trusted in flight. Pilots are taught that they should instead rely on their flight instruments.

Uses
The device is also used in motion sickness therapy.

Nobel Prize
The chair was named for Hungarian physiologist Robert Bárány, who used this device in his research into the role of the inner ear in the sense of balance. This won him the 1914 Nobel prize in Physiology or Medicine.

See also

Swivel chair

References

Aviation educators
Flight training
Medical equipment
Motion sickness